The Giarre murder was a 1980 double homicide in Giarre, Italy, that at the time, shocked Italy and was one of the birthstones of the Italian homosexual movement.

On October 31, 1980, two young men, 25-year old Giorgio Agatino Giamonna and 15-year old Antonio "Toni" Galatola, who had disappeared from home two weeks earlier, were found dead, hand in hand, both shot in the head. The two boys were called "i ziti" ("the boyfriends") in the village. Giorgio in particular was openly gay, after having been caught in a car by a local carabinieri with another young man at the age of 16 and therefore denounced, earning him the Sicilian derogatory nickname "puppu 'ccô bullu" ("licensed homosexual").

When journalists and photographers from all over Italy arrived at the scene to publicize the tragedy, they were met by the town's sense of omertà, not wanting to be associated with the story of a homosexual couple.

Investigations soon led to the identification of the perpetrator - Toni's 13-year old nephew Francesco Messina, who was therefore unpunishable. He claimed that the victims themselves had ordered him to kill them, saying that they had threatened to shoot him if he didn't comply. However, two days later, he recanted, claiming that he had taken responsibility under pressure from the carabinieri.

Thus no culprit was ever identified, but it was assumed it had been the 13-year old Francesco, having done so at the families' behest. It even went so far as to claim that the murder was even carried out with the approval of the two boys, who were convinced that they would never be able to live happily. Following the crime, Italian public opinion had to acknowledge the existence of homophobia.

The incident led to the creation of the eastern Sicilian chapter of Fuori! (Out!) - acronym for Fronte Unitario Omosessuale Rivoluzionario Italiano (Italian Revolutionary Homosexual Unitary Front), a gay rights organization founded in Turin in 1971. A month later in Palermo, openly gay former priest Marco Bisceglia, with help from a young conscientious objector Nichi Vendola and other militants, Massimo Milani and Gino Campanella, founded Arcigay, the first section of Arci dedicated to gay culture, which soon spread all over Italy. It effectively laid the seed for the birth of the contemporary Italian homosexual movement, after the first experiences of associationism made in Rome in the 1960s. Shortly thereafter, in Bologna for the first time there was official recognition of a gay group by the institutions with the granting by the City Council of a venue to the association Il Cassero.

On May 9, 2022, the City of Giarre affixed a memorial plaque dedicated to the two victims at the entrance of the "Domenico Cucinotta" municipal library.

References

1980 murders in Italy
Murder in Sicily
LGBT history in Italy
Catania